Gian Domenico Valentini (1639–1715) was an Italian painter of the Baroque period. He painted still lifes.

Partial Anthology
Interno di cucina

1639 births
1715 deaths
17th-century Italian painters
Italian male painters
18th-century Italian painters
Italian Baroque painters
Italian still life painters
18th-century Italian male artists